In Japanese folklore, Hitodama (Japanese ; meaning "human soul") are balls of fire that mainly float in the middle of the night. They are said to be "souls of the dead that have separated from their body," which is where their name comes from. A western comparison is the will-o'-the-wisp.

Summary 

Hitodama are mentioned in literature from ancient times. In the Man'yōshū, for example, a Nara period text, there is the following poem:

They are frequently confused with onibi and kitsunebi, but since hitodama are considered to be the "appearance of souls that have left the body and fly through the air," they are strictly speaking a different general idea.

Concerning their shape and nature, there are common features throughout Japan, but some differences could also be seen depending on the area. They fly crawling along at an elevation that is not very high. They have a colour that is blue, orange, or red, and also have a tail, but it can either be short or long. There are also a few that have been seen during daytime.

In the Okinawa Prefecture, hitodama are called , and in Nakijin, they are said to appear before a child is born and in some areas are also said to be mysterious flames that drive off humans to death.

In Kawakami, Inba District, Chiba Prefecture, (now Yachimata), hitodama are called  and are said to come out of the body 2 or 3 days after a human dies, and go toward temples or people they have a deep relation with. They are said to make a great sound in storm shutters and gardens, but that this sound can only be heard by those who have a deep relation with the spirit.

Theories 

According to one theory, "since funerals before the war were burials, so it would be common for the phosphorus that come from the body to react to the rain water on rainy nights and produce light, and the meagre knowledge about science from the masses produced the idea of hitodama."

Another possibility is that they come from fireflies, of which three species are common in Japan: Luciola cruciata (Genji hotaru; meaning "Genji's firefly"), Luciola lateralis (Heike hotaru; meaning "firefly from Heike"),  and Colophotia praeusta. All these snail-eating beetles and their larvae are famous for their ability to make special body parts glow (bioluminescence) and make them blink rhythmically. Every year at the Fusa-park in Tokyo the legendary feast Hotarugari (meaning "firefly catching") is celebrated. They have also been thought to possibly be misrecognitions of shooting stars, animals that have luminous bryophytes attached to them, gasses that come from swamps, light bulbs, or visual hallucinations. There have also been some "artificial hitodama" created using combustible gasses (an experiment in 1976 by the Meiji University professor, Masao Yamana using methane gas).

In the 1980s, Yoshiko Ootsuki posited the idea that they are "Plasma from the air."

However, there are some hitodama that cannot be explained by the above theories, so they are thought to come from various phenomena.

See also
 Ball lightning
 Soul
 Kitsunebi
 Yūrei
 Onibi
 Will-o'-the-wisp

Notes 
Translation note

References

Sources 
 Karen Ann Smyers: The fox and the jewel: shared and private meanings in contemporary Japanese inari worship. University of Hawaii Press, Honolulu 1999, page 117 & 118.
 Stephen Addiss, Helen Foresman: Japanese ghosts & demons: art of the supernatural. G. Braziller, Illinois 1985, 
 Lloyd Vernon Knutson, Jean-Claude Vala: Biology of Snail-Killing Sciomyzidae Flies. Cambridge University Press, Cambridge (UK) 2011, page 24.
 Chris Philo, Chris Wilbert: Animal spaces, beastly places: new geographies of human-animal relations (= Band 10 von Critical geographies). Routledge, London/New York 2000, page 172–173.

Atmospheric ghost lights
Japanese ghosts
Mythological monsters